Noé Maya Vilches (born 1 February 1985) is a Mexican professional football midfielder who plays for Correcaminos UAT.

Career
Born in Mexico City, Maya was a product of the Club América youth system and signed with San Luis F.C., where the midfielder would make his Mexican Primera División debut against Necaxa in 2005. He was sent on loan to Primera A sides Correcaminos UAT and Club Tijuana before he became a regular member of San Luis' first team. He suffered a relegation with San Luis, but helped the club return to the top flight before joining Tijuana on a permanent basis in 2011.

Honours

Club
Cafetaleros de Tapachula
 Ascenso MX: Clausura 2018

Chapulineros de Oaxaca
 Liga de Balompié Mexicano: 2020–21, 2021

References

External links
 

1985 births
Living people
Mexican footballers
Association football defenders
San Luis F.C. players
Correcaminos UAT footballers
Club Tijuana footballers
Salamanca F.C. footballers
Tecos F.C. footballers
Mineros de Zacatecas players
Cafetaleros de Chiapas footballers
Atlético San Luis footballers
Liga MX players
Ascenso MX players
Footballers from Mexico City
Liga de Balompié Mexicano players